A Finer Dawn is the debut studio album by Swedish singer Sarah Dawn Finer, released in 2007.

Track listing
"Come On"
"A Way Back to Love"
"You Were Meant for Me"
"I Remember Love"
"Out of the Darkness"
"Some Kind of Peace"
"I'll Be Ok"
"Wanna Try"
"It Feels So Good"
"Stockholm by Morning"
"Stay"
"Home"

Charts

References 

2007 albums
Sarah Dawn Finer albums